In Greek mythology, Pierus (Ancient Greek: Πίερος Píeros) was the son of Thessalian Magnes. He was the lover of muse Clio and father of Hyacinth in some accounts, and Rhagus.

Mythology 
Pierus was loved by muse Clio because Aphrodite had inspired her with the passion, as a punishment for deriding the goddess' own love for Adonis. This was the only myth where Pierus appeared once:

 "Clio fell in love with Pierus, son of Magnes, in consequence of the wrath of Aphrodite, whom she had twitted with her love of Adonis; and having met him she bore him a son Hyacinth.."

Notes

References 

Pseudo-Apollodorus, The Library with an English Translation by Sir James George Frazer, F.B.A., F.R.S. in 2 Volumes, Cambridge, MA, Harvard University Press; London, William Heinemann Ltd. 1921. Online version at the Perseus Digital Library. Greek text available from the same website.
 William Smith. A Dictionary of Greek and Roman biography and mythology. London (1873).

Thessalian characters in Greek mythology
Thessalian mythology